Aqui na Terra (Here on Earth) is a 1993 Portuguese film directed and written by João Botelho. It stars Luís Miguel Cintra, Jessica Weiss/Voz de Maria João Luís, Pedro Hestnes, Rita Dias.

Overview 
 Direction: João Botelho
 Script: João Botelho
 Production: Companhia de filmes do Príncipe Real; BBC
 Format: 35mm, color
 Genre: fiction (drama)
 Duration: 105’
 Length: 2900 meters
 Distributor: Marfilmes
 Release Date: Cinema Nimas, in Lisbon, October 14, 1993

Synopsis 
Miguel is a successful economist until his father's death plunges him into a strange obscure world of fears, eerie sounds and psychological isolation. He quits his job, drifts away from his wife and initiates a process of physical disintegration. He will touch the bottom before he starts seeing the light. And, as an echo to his journey, we follow, faraway in the countryside, the story of a crime and its redemption, the story of António and Cecília. From death to the miracle of life, here on earth.

Cast 
 Luís Miguel Cintra
 Jessica Weiss/Voz de Maria João Luís
 Pedro Hestnes
 Rita Dias

Crew 
 Director: João Botelho
 Cinematographer: Elso Roque
 Editing: José Nascimento
 Sound: Vasco Pimentel
 Production Design: Ana Vaz da Silva
 Score: António Pinho Vargas
 Costume Design: Manuela Aires, Rita Lopes Alves
 Makeup: Margarida Miranda

See also 
 Novo Cinema

External links 
 

1993 films
Films directed by João Botelho
Portuguese drama films
1990s Portuguese-language films